Lilium columbianum is a lily native to western North America. It is also known as the Columbia lily, Columbia tiger lily, or simply tiger lily (sharing the latter common name with several other lily species in its genus).

Distribution and habitat 
Lilium columbianum occurs in lowland and montane forest openings and meadows from southern British Columbia in Canada south to northern California and east to Montana in the northwestern United States. Mostly occurring below , it usually blooms in June through early August. There are a few isolated populations at high elevations in the Sierra Nevada as far south as Fresno County.

Description
The tepals are 3 to 6 cm long and the flowers are lightly scented. Like many true lilies, the leaves are arranged in whorls around the stem of the plant.

Uses

Food
Coast Salish, Nuu-chah-nulth and most western Washington peoples steamed, boiled or pit-cooked its bulbs. Bitter or peppery-tasting, they were mostly used as a flavoring, often in soup with meat or fish.

Horticulture
From seed, Lilium columbianum  requires three to five years to mature. Cultivated bulbs can be divided or bulb scales may be used to generate new plants more quickly.

Gallery

References

External links

columbianum
Flora of British Columbia
Flora of the Northwestern United States
Flora of the West Coast of the United States
Garden plants of North America
Plants used in Native American cuisine
Plants described in 1871
Flora without expected TNC conservation status